Irene Mary Wetton (26 July 1936 – 10 November 1998), better known by her stage name Mary Millar, was an English actress and singer best remembered for her role as the second actress to play Rose in the successful BBC sitcom Keeping Up Appearances between 1991 and 1995.

Early life
Irene Mary Wetton was born in Doncaster, England, on 26 July 1936 to Horace and Irene (née Mellor) Wetton, both music hall singers. She intended to become a stable hand, but later decided to pursue a stage career. She toured the country with her parents, who had an act called Sweethearts in Harmony.

Career
Millar made her first television appearance in 1953, aged 17, in Those Were the Days. She also made appearances on The Dick Emery Show and The Stanley Baxter Show. Millar gained acclaim for her part in Keeping Up Appearances as Rose, replacing Shirley Stelfox for Series 2 in 1991 as Stelfox had prior commitments to Making Out. Millar remained with the programme through to its conclusion in 1995.

In 1960, Millar travelled to New York to understudy Julie Andrews in Camelot. She began her West End career in 1962 as Cloris in Lock Up Your Daughters. In 1969, she played the title role in the musical Ann Veronica, based on H. G. Wells' novel. In 1986, Millar originated the role of Madame Giry in Andrew Lloyd Webber's musical The Phantom of the Opera. She played the role for four years and her voice appears on the original cast album. 

From 1997 to 1998, Millar played Mrs Potts in the London production of Beauty and the Beast, and appeared on the cast album composed by Alan Menken with lyrics by Howard Ashman and Tim Rice. In February 1998, Millar left the show because of deteriorating health.

Personal life
Millar had one daughter, Lucy (born 1972), by her marriage to Rafael D. Frame, in 1962. She was a practising Christian.

Death
In January 1998, Millar was diagnosed with ovarian cancer and underwent chemotherapy. She died on 10 November, at the age of 62, in Brockley, London, with her husband and daughter at her bedside. She was cremated at Golders Green Crematorium. Three weeks before her death, when asked what she would do when she arrived at heaven's door, Millar said, "Rehearse for a part in the Angelic choir, darling." An episode of Keeping Up Appearances was broadcast on BBC One the following week and dedicated to her.

Works

Television

Theatre

References

External links
Overview of Mary Millar's career

Mary Millar at the British Film Institute

1936 births
1998 deaths
20th-century English actresses
Actresses from Yorkshire
Deaths from cancer in England
Deaths from ovarian cancer
English Christians
English stage actresses
English television actresses
Actors from Doncaster